"Mad About You" is a song by English artist Sting, released in March 1991 as the second single from his third studio album, The Soul Cages (1991). The song’s lyrics are based on the story of King David from the book of Samuel. The single did not match the success of its predecessor, "All This Time", only reaching number 56 on the UK Singles Chart and missing the Billboard Hot 100 completely.

Critical reception
Pan-European magazine Music & Media wrote, "Mostly he sounds calculated, but Sting can still be a thrill. This second single, the best track from his new album The Soul Cages, is destined for greatness."

Charts

References

Sting (musician) songs
1991 singles
Songs written by Sting (musician)
A&M Records singles
1990 songs